Nile Niami (born February 25, 1968) is an Iraqi American former film producer turned real estate developer, who has built and sold multi-million dollar mansions in the Los Angeles neighborhoods of Bel Air and Holmby Hills.

Early life
Niami was born in 1968 in Los Angeles, California. He was raised by a single mother, a special education teacher.

Career
Niami started his career as a film producer. He produced 15 films, many of them B movies, before he started building small condominiums and renovating homes to sell.

As a real estate developer in Los Angeles, Niami built a mansion in Holmby Hills which he sold to a Saudi buyer for US$44 million. He built another house in Holmby Hills, which was purchased by musician Sean Combs for US$39 million in 2014. He also hired architect Paul McClean to build a house for the Winklevoss twins Cameron and Tyler in the Bird Streets (north of Sunset Boulevard). He built a house in Trousdale Estates, a neighborhood in the city of Beverly Hills, with "a spinning car turntable, similar to those in auto showrooms, that's visible from the living room."

Niami launched Wolfpack, a mobile app for single men looking for friends; it is no longer available.

"The One"
Niami's mega-mansion in Bel-Air, "The One", was also designed by Paul McClean. After eight years of development and numerous delays, it was completed in 2021. The construction attracted unease from the Bel-Air Homeowners Alliance, whose chairman, Fred Rosen, suggested it was so big it should have been "considered a commercial project", subject to more restrictive regulations. It was billed as the most expensive private residence in the United States, and at 105,000 square feet, is one of the country's largest private homes. The residential property features nine bedrooms, multiple kitchens, a nightclub, four-lane bowling alley, salon, gym, 50-seat theater, a running track, a 50-car underground garage, and a moat.

In March 2021, Niami's LLC, Crestlloyd, defaulted on US$165 million in debt related to the property, causing it to enter receivership. A foreclosure sale scheduled for October 2021 was halted when Crestlloyd filed for Chapter 11 bankruptcy.

In July 2021, the 3.8-acre property was placed in court-ordered receivership by Los Angeles County Superior Court. Ted Lanes of Lanes Management was appointed as receiver. Lanes oversaw completion of the property and secured a certificate of occupancy.

Once valued at US$500 million, "The One" was formally listed for sale in January 2022 at an asking price of US$295 million. It did not receive an offer and on March 4, 2022, The property was sold at auction for US$127 million, becoming one of the most expensive houses ever sold at an auction in the United States. It broke the previous record that was set in 2021 when The Hearst Estate in Beverly Hills sold at auction for US$63.1 million. The buyer was Richard Saghian, owner of Fashion Nova.

Personal life
Niami purchased Scooter Braun's Bel Air house for US$9.5 million in July 2015.

Filmography

As producer
Galaxis (1995)
T.N.T. (1997)
DNA (1997)
Point Blank (1998)
The Patriot (1998)
The Survivor (1998)
Resurrection (1999)
Justice (1999)
The Watcher (2000)
Camouflage (2001)
Tart (2001)

References

External links

Living people
1960s births
People from Bel Air, Los Angeles
Businesspeople from Los Angeles
Film producers from California
American real estate businesspeople